Barbara Katz Rothman (born 1948) is a professor of sociology and women's studies at the City University of New York (CUNY). Her work encompasses medical sociology, childbirth and midwifery, bioethics, race, disability, food studies, and the sociology of knowledge.

Biography
Barbara Katz Rothman was born in Brooklyn, New York in 1948. She received her undergraduate and master's degrees from Brooklyn College and in 1979 a Ph.D in Sociology from New York University. In 1979, she became a faculty member of Baruch College and the Graduate Centre of the City University of New York (CUNY).

She was one of the first sociologists to look seriously at childbirth, resulting in her dissertation and first book, In Labor. She moved on to study issues in prenatal diagnosis, and the consequences of the newly developing technologies of amniocentesis and other genetic testing in pregnancy for the women involved, resulting in The Tentative Pregnancy.

In 1987, she joined other feminists of the time, including Gloria Steinem, Betty Friedan, Phyllis Chesler, Mary Daly, and Evelyn Fox Keller to write an amicus brief opposing surrogacy in the Baby M case. The brief argues that allowing women to charge a fee for bearing another couple's child would lead to their exploitation having been reduced to a commodity. The Baby M case signified an advancement in reproductive technology and was the impetus for Recreating Motherhood: Ideology and Technology in a Patriarchical Society, published in 1989. In the book, Katz Rothman emphasizes the social, political and technological implications of birthing and raising a child in a patriarchal society. She discusses the legal parental rights of the birth mother and child-care providers and argues for a shift in reproductive practices in order to reflect the collective experiences of women. In 1991, she was awarded the Jessie Bernard Award by the American Sociological Association for Recreating Motherhood.

In 1993, she was President of the Society for the Study of Social Problems, which has awarded her the Lee Founders Award in 2006, and the Mentoring Award in 2019. In 1995, she was awarded a Fulbright Professorship to the University of Groningen, in the Netherlands. In 1998, she was the President of the Sociologists for Women in Society (SWS), from which she won the Mentoring Award in 1995 and the SWS Feminist Lecturer Award in 1988. She also received an award for “Midwifing the Movement” from the Midwives Alliance of North America (MANA) in 2012. She was the President of the Eastern Sociological Society for the 2016 presidential term, and was the recipient of the Fulbright-Saastamoinen Foundation Distinguished Chair in Health Sciences 2018–2019.

Journals and popular media
Barbara Katz Rothman is widely published in both popular and scholarly sources, including Social Problems, Virtual Mentor of the AMA, MIDIRS Midwifery Digest, Annual Review of Health Sciences of Australia, The Japanese Midwifery Journal, The MT. Sinai Journal of Medicine, Gender & Society, Fetal Diagnosis and Therapy, NOVA Law Review, The Journal of Bioethical Inquiry, The Chronicle of Higher Education, MS., Glamour, European Journal of Obstetrics & Gynecology and Reproductive Biology, MAMM, Conscience, Midwifery Today, and Legal Affairs. Katz Rothman coined the term "midwifery model" to distinguish the work of home birth midwives from standard medical practice around birth, the "medical model."

Books

Reference Notes

External links
 
 Barbara Katz Rothman at Baruch College
 Jessie Bernard Award
 Leverhulme Visiting Professorships
 An interview with Barbara Katz Rothman
 Health Vision: Giving Birth in the United States, a discussion with Barbara Katz Rothman
 Health Vision: Prenatal Testing, a discussion with Barbara Katz Rothman
 
 
 http://muse.jhu.edu/journals/sof/summary/v080/80.4boulis.html

1948 births
Living people
Jewish women writers
Jewish American writers
Activists for African-American civil rights
American sociologists
American women sociologists
American science writers
Medical sociologists
Women science writers
City University of New York faculty
Graduate Center, CUNY faculty
Brooklyn College alumni
Disability studies academics